Francis Henry Goodall (January 10, 1838 – April 12, 1925) was a Union Army soldier in the American Civil War who received the U.S. military's highest decoration, the Medal of Honor.

Goodall was born in Bath, New Hampshire on January 10, 1838. He was awarded the Medal of Honor, for extraordinary heroism shown on December 13, 1862, while serving as a First Sergeant with Company G, 11th New Hampshire Volunteer Infantry, at Fredericksburg, Virginia. His Medal of Honor was issued on December 14, 1894.

He died at the age of 87, on April 12, 1925, and was buried at the Rock Creek Cemetery in Washington, D.C.

Medal of Honor citation

References

External links

1838 births
1925 deaths
People from Bath, New Hampshire
People of New Hampshire in the American Civil War
Union Army soldiers
United States Army Medal of Honor recipients
American Civil War recipients of the Medal of Honor